Largs Pier Hotel is located on the corner of The Esplanade and Jetty Road in Largs Bay, South Australia.

Opening 
The Largs Pier Hotel opened in 1882 on the same day as the Largs Bay Railway and Pier.
Believed to be 23 December according to The Port Adelaide Historical Society.

Immigration 
From 1882 till around 1892 the Largs Pier was the primary port of call for New Australians travelling from Europe. Many of these immigrants spent their first nights in Australia at the hotel.

Music 
The Largs Pier Hotel has a rich history of live performances. Jimmy Barnes has such fond memories of playing at the venue that he wrote a song in 2010 honouring the Hotel, "Largs Pier Hotel", which appears on his 30:30 Hindsight Album. AC/DC frontman Bon Scott met his wife, Irene Thornton at the Hotel after a performance in 1974.

Other acts to play at the venue include Lobby Loyde, Split Enz, The Angels, Cold Chisel and Billy Thorpe. In addition to Mississippi, Skyhooks, Little River Band and Rose Tattoo.

Drive Through Bottle Shop 
The drive through bottle shop at the Largs Pier Hotel was the first of its kind in Australia opening in 1953.

References

Buildings and structures in Adelaide
Hotel buildings completed in 1882
Lefevre Peninsula